Government Arts College for Women, Ramanathapuram, is a women's general degree college located in Ramanathapuram, Tamil Nadu. It was established in the year 1994. The college is affiliated with Alagappa University. This college offers different courses in arts, commerce and science.

Departments

Science
Biochemistry 
Chemistry
Mathematics
Electronics
Computer Science
Physics

Arts and Commerce
Tamil
English
Home Science
Business Administration
Commerce

Accreditation
The college is  recognized by the University Grants Commission (UGC).

References

External links

Educational institutions established in 1994
1994 establishments in Tamil Nadu
Colleges affiliated to Alagappa University